The Digon stream is a torrential watercourse in the Comelico region.

It originates from the northeastern slopes of Col Quaternà and runs through the homonymous valley, first in a south-easterly direction then in a southerly direction. It flows into the Padola in Gera di San Nicolò di Comelico.

Notes 

Rivers of the Province of Belluno